Aetna is an unincorporated community in Barber County, Kansas, United States.  It lies at an elevation of 1631 feet (497 m).

History
The post office in Aetna was discontinued in 1946.

References

Further reading

External links
 Barber County maps: Current, Historic, KDOT

Unincorporated communities in Barber County, Kansas
Unincorporated communities in Kansas